The Davis-Freeman House is a historic house in Gloucester, Massachusetts.  Built in the early 18th century, it is a rare local example of a plank-framed house.  It was listed on the National Register of Historic Places in 1990.  It presently serves as part of a homeless shelter.

Description and history
It's set just north of the Little River, a tidal tributary of the Annisquam River. It's a -story plank construction, with a gabled roof and clapboarded exterior. Its second story projects beyond the first in front, where the exposed timbers are seen to be hand-hewn, and moulded post heads are visible. The windows and central chimney are the product of a c. 1930s restoration. It's had a few 20th century additions.

In 1709 Jacob Davis acquired a grant of land at the head of the Little River, and by 1712 he had built this house and a mill on it.  For most of the 18th century the house was used as a hostel and tavern.  In 1860 it was purchased by Robin Freeman, an escaped slave, and it remained in the Freeman family until 1929.  In that year its original chimney was destroyed in a chimney fire.  It was then purchased by Peter Keffer, who undertook the restoration of the property.  It now serves as part of a homeless shelter.

See also
National Register of Historic Places listings in Gloucester, Massachusetts
National Register of Historic Places listings in Essex County, Massachusetts

References

External links

Wellspring House web site

Houses in Gloucester, Massachusetts
Houses on the National Register of Historic Places in Essex County, Massachusetts